Counterspy or CounterSpy may refer to:
 CounterSpy (magazine), an American espionage magazine
 Counterspy (radio series), an American espionage drama radio series
 CounterSpy (software), an antispyware application of Sunbelt Software
 CounterSpy (video game), a 2014 video game
 Counterspy (film), a 1953 British film by Vernon Sewell
 Counter Spy (film), an action comedy film in development by The H Collective and iQiyi

See also
 Counter-espionage